Umananda Island  is the smallest inhabited river islet in the middle of river Brahmaputra, flowing through the city of Guwahati in Assam, a state in northeast India.

Its name derives from  Assamese Uma, another name for the Hindu goddess Parvati, the wife of Shiva; and ananda, which translates to "joy". A British officer named the island Peacock Island for its structure, which he thought resembled the splayed feathers of a peacock. It is also known as Bhasmachal, from the words bhasma, meaning 'to destroy', and chal, meaning 'place'. The legend giving rise to this name is that Kamdev, the god of love in Hindu mythology, after interrupting Shiva in the middle of a deep meditation on the islet, was burnt to ashes. 

It is mostly visited for its Shiva temple, the Umananda Temple, and was also home to a large population of golden langurs, an endangered species of primate.

The islet can be reached via a 10-minute ferry, available from Umananda Ghat, located near the Guwahati High Court.

Mythology

According to Hindu mythology, Shiva created the island for his wife Parvati's happiness and pleasure. Shiva is said to have resided here in the form of Bhayananda. According to a myth in Kalika Purana, Shiva burnt Kamadeva with his third eye on Umananda when he interrupted Shiva's deep meditation, hence its alternative name Bhasmachal (Assamese: bhasma, "ash"; and achal, "hill"; literally, "hill of ashes").

History
In 1897, an earthquake damaged the temple heavily, but was later repaired by a local merchant. The temple displays a mixture of both Hindu Vaishnavism and Shaivism. There are Assamese craftings of Ganesha, Shiva, Parvati, Vishnu, and other Hindu deities. During the repairing work of the temple, some new Vaishnavi scripts were written on the walls. Craftsmen also carved figures out of rocks on the island.

Festivals
Maha Shivaratri is widely celebrated in Umananda. Monday is considered to be the holiest day in the temple and the new moon brings bliss to the pilgrims.

Biodiversity

Umananda Island was home to the species of the endangered golden langur, introduced to the island in the 1980s, with the last one dying in 2020.

The island is dotted with tamarind trees.

See also 

 Hindu pilgrimage sites
 National Geological Monuments of India
 List of Hindu temples
 Umananda Temple
 Tourism in India
 Yatra

References

Guwahati
Islands of the River Brahmaputra
Landforms of Assam

Hindu pilgrimage sites
Tourism in Assam
Islands of India